Watch with Mother was a cycle of children's programmes created by Freda Lingstrom and Maria Bird. Broadcast by BBC Television from 1952 until 1975, it was the first BBC television series aimed specifically at pre-school children, a development of BBC radio's equivalent Listen with Mother, which had begun two years earlier. In accordance with its intended target audience of pre-school children viewing with their mothers, Watch with Mother was initially broadcast between 3:45 pm and 4:00 pm, post-afternoon nap and before the older children came home from school.

The choice of Watch with Mother for the title of the series was intended "to deflect fears that television might become a nursemaid to children and encourage bad mothering".

Show cycles 
Although Andy Pandy had been regularly broadcast every week since mid-1950 (normally on Tuesdays), and was joined by Flower Pot Men in December 1952 (normally on Wednesdays), the name Watch with Mother was not adopted until January 1953, shortly before the programming was expanded to three afternoons a week with the addition of Rag, Tag and Bobtail that September. The "classic" cycle of shows was in place by September 1955, with the first showing of The Woodentops.

Broadcast at 1:30 pm each day, it comprised:

 Picture Book – Mondays, from 1955
 Andy Pandy – Tuesdays, from 1950
 Flower Pot Men – Wednesdays, from 1952
 Rag, Tag and Bobtail – Thursdays, from 1953
 The Woodentops – Fridays, from 1955

Each of the five classic shows actually consisted of only a very small number of episodes, all made on film – and all in black-and-white. Typically, not more than 26 programmes were filmed for each show, this being sufficient for a run of six months as there was only one broadcast per week. The aim was to provide children's programming on the cheap: the BBC Children's department had an extremely tiny budget, and needed a collection of films which could be endlessly repeated, typically in six-monthly cycles, for its undemanding pre-school age audience.

From April 1963, Watch with Mother was moved to 10.45am (with a further slot at 1.30pm from September 1963). Tales of the Riverbank joined the Watch with Mother slot in December 1963.

 Picture Book – Mondays mornings and Wednesday afternoons (from March 1965, only shown on Mondays)
 Andy Pandy – Tuesday mornings and Thursday afternoons
 Flower Pot Men – Wednesday mornings and Friday afternoons
 Rag, Tag and Bobtail – Thursdays mornings and Monday afternoons (from December 1963, only shown on Thursday mornings)
 The Woodentops – Friday mornings and Tuesday afternoons

The original programmes had a loyal following, and there was concern when it was learned that they would be replaced by new programmes, as in 1965 when it was (wrongly) rumoured that the new show, Camberwick Green, would replace Andy Pandy and Flower Pot Men. Camberwick Green eventually was slotted in the Monday slot in January 1966 and saw an end to Picture Book. Eventually, new programmes were added, including Tales of the Riverbank, Pogles' Wood, The Herbs, Joe, the Trumptonshire trilogy, Barnaby, Mary, Mungo and Midge, Mr Benn, Fingerbobs, Ragtime, Bod, and Bizzy Lizzy.

After 1975 – Name change and later developments 

In 1975, the Watch with Mother title was dropped, as it was considered to be dated, and the strand was known as See-Saw from 1980 to 1990. A Watch with Mother video became a best-seller in 1987, and was followed by a second and a third in 1989 and a 'best of' in 1993.

A 45rpm promotional single was available to radio disc jockeys, for promo only, entitled "Flob-A-Dob-A-Ben", in 1987. The single was not released on general release and was played often as a novelty record by Radio Trent on the Andy Marriott Television Show. As the shows were a great success – and fondly remembered by many – modern incarnations of Andy Pandy and Flower Pot Men have been produced.

Under British law, copyright in TV programmes lasts for 50 years from the date of first broadcast.

In the early 2000s, the shows Andy Pandy and Bill and Ben were remade as stop motion animations, which aired on CBeebies.

UK VHS releases (1987–1993) 
Between 1987 and 1993, four compilation videos with Watch with Mother shows have been released by the BBC.

See also 
 For the Children, a television programme for school-age children that ran from 1937.

References 
Notes

Bibliography

External links 
  More information and clips from the programmes
  Link to complete listing & details about all the programmes
 Link to Museum of Broadcast

1950s British children's television series
1960s British children's television series
1970s British children's television series
1952 British television series debuts
1975 British television series endings
BBC children's television shows